Heart is the eighth studio album by American rock band Heart, released on June 21, 1985, by Capitol Records. The album continued the band's transition into mainstream rock, a genre that yielded the band its greatest commercial success. Marking the band's Capitol Records debut, it became Heart's only album to top the US Billboard 200 to date. The album was eventually certified quintuple platinum by the Recording Industry Association of America (RIAA)—in contrast to Heart's previous two releases, Private Audition and Passionworks, which remain uncertified—proving that adopting a glam metal direction helped resurrect the band.

The album yielded the band's first number-one single, "These Dreams", along with four other singles: "What About Love", "Never", "Nothin' at All", and "If Looks Could Kill", with the first four singles reaching the top 10 of the Billboard Hot 100. In 1986, the album was nominated for a Grammy Award for Best Rock Performance by a Duo or Group with Vocal.

Track listing

Notes
  Connie is a pseudonym for Ann Wilson, Nancy Wilson and Sue Ennis.

Personnel
Credits adapted from the liner notes of Heart.

Heart
 Ann Wilson – vocals
 Nancy Wilson – lead guitar, acoustic guitar, mandolin, background vocals; lead vocals 
 Howard Leese – lead guitar, keyboards, mandolin, background vocals
 Mark Andes – bass guitar
 Denny Carmassi – drums

Additional musicians
 Peter Wolf – synthesizers, acoustic piano
 Mickey Thomas – background vocals 
 Johnny Colla – background vocals 
 Grace Slick – background vocals 
 Lynn Wilson – background vocals
 Holly Knight – keyboards
 Frankie Sullivan – solo guitar ; additional guitar

Technical
 Scotty Olson – guitar technician
 Gary Clark – drum technician
 Ron Nevison – production, engineering
 Mike Clink – engineering assistance
 Brian Foraker – second assistant engineer
 Mike Reese – mastering at The Mastering Lab (Hollywood, California)

Artwork
 Rebecca Blake – photography
 Norman Moore – art direction, design

Charts

Weekly charts

Year-end charts

All-time charts

Certifications

References

1985 albums
Albums produced by Ron Nevison
Albums recorded at Record Plant (Los Angeles)
Capitol Records albums
Heart (band) albums